Hagemeister is a German surname. Notable people with the surname include:

Charles C. Hagemeister (1946–2021), United States Army officer and Medal of Honor recipient
Henry F. Hagemeister (1855–1915), American politician
Karl Hagemeister (1848–1933), German landscape painter
Ludwig von Hagemeister (1780–1833), Imperial Russian explorer
Michael Hagemeister (born 1951), German scholar, historian and Slavist

See also
Hagemeister Island, Alaska, United States
Hagemeister Park, Wisconsin, United States

German-language surnames